This article consists of the ITU and Ironman Triathlon events for 2019.

2020 Summer Olympics
 August 15 – 18: 2019 Tokyo ITU World Olympic Qualification Event
 Elite winners:  Tyler Mislawchuk (m) /  Flora Duffy (f)

2019 ITU World Triathlon Series
 March 8 & 9: WTS #1 in  Abu Dhabi
 Elite winners:  Mario Mola (m) /  Katie Zaferes (f)
 April 27: WTS #2 in 
 Elite winners:  Dorian Coninx (m) /  Katie Zaferes (f)
 May 18 & 19: WTS #3 in  Yokohama
 Elite winners:  Vincent Luis (m) /  Katie Zaferes (f)
 June 8 & 9: WTS #4 in  Leeds
 Elite winners:  Jacob Birtwhistle (m) /  Georgia Taylor-Brown (f)
 June 28 & 29: WTS #5 in  Montreal
 Elite winners:  Jelle Geens (m) /  Katie Zaferes (f)
 July 6 & 7: WTS #6 in  Hamburg
 Elite winners:  Jacob Birtwhistle (m) /  Non Stanford (f)
 July 20 & 21: WTS #7 in  Edmonton
 Elite winners:  Jonny Brownlee (m) /  Emma Jackson (f)
 August 29 – September 1: WTS Grand Final (#8) in  Lausanne
 Elite winners:  Kristian Blummenfelt (m) /  Katie Zaferes (f)
 Junior winners:  Ricardo Batista (m) /  Beatrice Mallozzi (f)
 U23 winners:  Roberto Sanchez Mantecon (m) /  Emilie Morier (f)

World triathlon championships & cup
 February 9 & 10: 2019 Asiago ITU Winter Triathlon World Championships in 
 Elite winners:  Pavel Andreev (m) /  Daria Rogozina (f)
 Junior winners:  Simone Avondetto (m) /  Giorgia Rigoni (f)
 U23 winners:  Franco Pesavento (m) /  Daria Rogozina (f)
 2x2 Mixed Relay winners:  (Daria Rogozina & Pavel Andreev)
 Junior 2x2 Mixed Relay winners:  (Giorgia Rigoni & Simone Avondetto)
 April 27 – May 4: 2019 Pontevedra ITU Multisport World Championships in 
 Duathlon
 Elite winners:  Benjamin Choquert (m) /  Sandra Levenez (f)
 Junior winners:  Sergio Baxter Cabrera (m) /  Delia Sclabas (f)
 U23 winners:  Arnaud Mengal (m) /  Edymar Daniely Brea Abreu (f)
 Cross triathlon
 Elite winners:  Arthur Forissier (m) /  Eleonora Peroncini (f)
 Junior winners:  Oscar Gladney Rundqvist (m) /  Willemijn Fuite (f)
 U23 winners:  Maxim Chane (m) /  Loanne Duvoisin (f)
 Aquathlon
 Elite winners:  Rostyslav Pevtsov (m) /  Alicja Ulatowska (f)
 Junior winners:  Esteban Basanta Fouz (m) /  Bianca Seregni (f)
 U23 winners:  Ander Noain Lacamara (m) /  Alicja Ulatowska (f)
 Long Distance
 Elite winners:  Javier Gómez Noya (m) /  Alexandra 	Tondeur (f)
 July 7: 2019 Hamburg ITU Triathlon Mixed Relay World Championships in 
 Mixed Relay winners:  (Emilie Morier, Léo Bergere, Cassandre Beaugrand, & Vincent Luis)
 September 7 & 8: 2019 Wenzhou ITU Multisport World Cup in 
 Long Distance
 Elite winners:  Jaroslav Kovacic (m) /  Ewa Bugdol (f)
 Duathlon
 Elite winners:  Trent Dodds (m) /  TANG Zhilin (f)
 September 8: 2019 Zofingen ITU Powerman Long Distance Duathlon World Championships in 
 Elite winners:  Diego van Looy (m) /  Nina Zoller (f)

Regional triathlon championships
 February 23: 2019 Havana CAMTRI Middle Distance Triathlon Iberoamerican Championships in 
 Men's Elite winner:  Michel Gonzalez Castro
 March 1 – 3: 2019 Playa Hermosa CAMTRI Sprint Triathlon American Cup and Central American & Caribbean Championships in 
 Elite winners:  Carlos Javier Quinchara Forero (m) /  Lina Maria Raga (f)
 Junior winners:  Alvaro Campos Solano (m) /  Daniela Ciara Vega (f)
 Youth winners:  Sebastian Morales Arce (m) /  Adriana López (f)
 March 24: 2019 Huelva ETU Triathlon European Cup and Iberoamerican Championships in 
 Elite winners:  Barclay Izzard (m) /  Pauline Landron (f)
 March 30: 2019 Sharm El Sheikh ATU Sprint Triathlon African Cup and Pan Arab Championships in 
 Elite winners:  Ilya Prasolov (m) /  Bianca Bogen (f)
 U23 winners:  Mohanad Elshafei (m) /  Basmla Elsalamoney (f)
 Youth winners:  Abdelrahman Sherif (m) /  Maram Yasser Mohamed (f)
 Mixed Relay winners:  (Rehab Hamdy, Mohamed Tarek, Basmla Elsalamoney, & Mohanad Elshafei)
 March 30 & 31: 2019 Montevideo CAMTRI Sprint Triathlon American Cup and South American Championships in 
 Elite winners:  Diogo Sclebin (m) /  Romina Biagioli (f)
 Junior winners:  Miguel Hidalgo (m) /  Giovanna Lacerda (f)
 U23 winners:  Diego Moya (m) /  Paula Jara (f)
 Youth winners:  Matias Sebastian Bravo Delgado (m) /  Josselin Michell Yuqui Peralta (f)
 April 27: 2019 Pokhara NTT ASTC Sprint Triathlon Asian Cup and South Asian Championships in 
 Elite winners:  Makoto Odakura (m) /  Park Ye-jin (f)
 May 11: 2019 Sines ETU Sprint Triathlon European Cup and Mediterranean Championships in 
 Elite winners:  Genis Grau (m) /  Emmie Charayron (f)
 June 29 & 30: 2019 Cholpon-Ata ASTC Sprint Triathlon Asian Cup and Central Asian Championships in 
 Elite winners:  Ognjen Stojanović (m) /  Kseniia Levkovska (f)
 July 13: 2019 Tartu ETU Triathlon European Cup and Baltic Championships in 
 Elite winners:  Samuel Dickinson (m) /  Annika Koch (f)
 August 3 & 4: 2019 Istanbul ETU Triathlon Balkan Championships in 
 Elite winners:  Gültigin Er (m) /  Zeljka Milicic (f)
 September 22: 2019 Osaka Castle ASTC Sprint Triathlon Asian Cup and East Asian Championships in 
 Elite winners:  Takumi Hojo (m) /  Sophie Linn (f)
 October 11: 2019 Luxor ATU Sprint Duathlon African Championships & Pan Arab Championships in 
 Elite winners:  Mohamed Aziz Sebai (m) /  Basmla Elsalamoney (f)
 Junior winners:  Mohamed Aziz Sebai (m) /  Haidy Taymour (f)
 Youth winners:  Khaled Sayed Ghraib Altaib (m) /  Nour Hamed (f)
 U23 winners:  Siefeldin Ismail (m) /  Basmla Elsalamoney (f)

2019 ITU Triathlon World Cup
 February 9 & 10: TWC #1 in  Cape Town
 Elite winners:  Alex Yee (m) /  Ai Ueda (f)
 March 16: TWC #2 in  Mooloolaba
 Elite winners:  Tyler Mislawchuk (m) /  Ashleigh Gentle (f)
 March 31: TWC #3 in  New Plymouth
 Elite winners:  Luke Willian (m) /  Angelica Olmo (f)
 May 4 & 5: TWC #4 in  Madrid
 Elite winners:  Justus Nieschlag (m) /  Emilie Morier (f)
 May 11 & 12: TWC #5 in  Chengdu
 Elite winners:  Matthew Hauser (m) /  Laura Lindemann (f)
 May 18: TWC #6 in  Cagliari
 Elite winners:  Alistair Brownlee (m) /  Sophie Coldwell (f)
 June 8 & 9: TWC #7 in  Huatulco
 Elite winners:  Tyler Mislawchuk (m) /  Summer Rappaport (f)
 June 15 & 16: TWC #8 in  Nur-Sultan
 Elite winners:  Matthew Hauser (m) /  Ai Ueda (f)
 June 23: TWC #9 in  Antwerp
 Elite winners:  Tayler Reid (m) /  Lisa Tertsch (f)
 July 13 & 14: TWC #10 in  Tiszaújváros
 Elite winners:  Eli Hemming (m) /  Emma Jeffcoat (f)
 August 25: TWC #11 in  Karlovy Vary
 Elite winners:  Samuel Dickinson (m) /  Vendula Frintová (f)
 September 7: TWC #12 in  Banyoles
 Elite winners:  Vincent Luis (m) /  Laura Lindemann (f)
 September 21 & 22: TWC #13 in  Weihai
 Elite winners:  João Pedro Silva (m) /  Julie Derron (f)
 October 19: TWC #14 in  Tongyeong
 Elite winners:  Matthew McElroy (m) /  Sandra Dodet (f)
 October 26: TWC #15 in  Miyazaki
 Elite winners:  Matthew McElroy (m) /  Ai Ueda (f)
 November 3: TWC #16 in  Lima
 Elite winners:  Manoel Messias (m) /  Ai Ueda (f)
 November 9 & 10: TWC #17 (final) in  Santo Domingo
 Elite winners:  Matthew McElroy (m) /  Andrea Hewitt (f)

2019 ITU World Triathlon Mixed Relay Series
 March 9: 2019 ITU World Triathlon Mixed Relay Series Abu Dhabi in 
 Winners:  (Ashleigh Gentle, Luke Willian, Emma Jeffcoat, & Jacob Birtwhistle)
 June 15: 2019 ITU World Triathlon Mixed Relay Series Nottingham in 
 Winners:  (Georgia Taylor-Brown, Ben Dijkstra, Sophie Coldwell, & Alex Yee)
 July 20 & 21: 2019 ITU World Triathlon Mixed Relay Series Edmonton in 
 Winners:  (Ainsley Thorpe, Tayler Reid, Nicole van der Kaay, & Hayden Wilde)
 August 18: 2019 ITU World Triathlon Mixed Relay Series Tokyo in 
 Winners:  (Cassandre Beaugrand, Pierre Le Corre, Leonie Periault, & Dorian Coninx)

European Triathlon Union (ETU)
 February 23 & 24: 2019 Cheile Grădiştei ETU Winter Triathlon European Championships in 
 Elite winners:  Dmitriy Bregeda (m) /  Daria Rogozina (f)
 Junior winners:  Simone Avondetto (m) /  Zuzana Michalickova (f)
 U23 winners:  Alessandro Saravalle (m) /  Daria Rogozina (f)
 2x2 Mixed Relay winners:  (Svetlana Sokolova & Pavel Andreev)
 May 11: 2019 Viborg ETU Powerman Middle Distance Duathlon European Championships in 
 Elite winners:  Daan de Groot (m) /  Petra Eggenschwiler (f)
 May 31 – June 2: 2019 Weert ETU Triathlon European Championships in the 
 Elite winners:  Alistair Brownlee (m) /  Beth Potter (f)
 Junior winners:  Paul Georgenthum (m) /  Beatrice Mallozzi (f)
 June 20 – 23: 2019 Kitzbühel ETU Triathlon Youth European Championships Festival in 
 Youth winners:  Igor Bellido Mikhailova (m) /  Anna Goreva (f)
 Youth Mixed Relay winners:  (Elsa Pena Vicente, Esteban Basanta Fouz, Nerea Garcia Busto, & Igor Bellido Mikhailova)
 June 28 – July 7: 2019 Târgu Mureș ETU Multisport European Championships in 
 Aquathlon
 Elite winners:  Ognjen Stojanović (m) /  Bianca Seregni (f)
 Junior winners:  Vitalii Vorontsov (m) /  Bianca Seregni (f)
 U23 winners:  Alexis Kardes (m) /  Valentyna Molchanets (f)
 Cross Duathlon
 Elite winners:  Arthur Serrieres (m) /  Morgane Riou (f)
 Junior winners:  Corentin Lefer (m) /  Zuzana Michalickova (f)
 U23 winners:  Tommaso Gatti (m) /  Daria Rogozina (f)
 Cross triathlon
 Elite winners:  Rubén Ruzafa (m) /  Morgane Riou (f)
 Junior winners:  Lucas Goene (m) /  Zuzana Michalickova (f)
 U23 winners:  Tommaso Gatti (m) /  Marta Menditto (f)
 Duathlon
 Elite winners:  Benjamin Choquert (m) /  Irene Loizate Sarrionandia (f)
 Junior winners:  Vitalii Vorontsov (m) /  Liza Hazuchova (f)
 U23 winners:  Krilan le Bihan (m) /  Marta Pintanel Raymundo (f)
 Middle Distance Triathlon
 Elite winners:  Andrey Bryukhankov (m) /  Katrina Rye (f)
 July 26 – 28: 2019 Kazan ETU Sprint Triathlon European Championships in 
 Elite winners:  Gordon Benson (m) /  Julie Derron (f)
 September 12 – 14: 2019 Almere-Amsterdam ETU Challenge Long Distance Triathlon European Championships in the 
 Elite winners:  Matt Trautman (m) /  Yvonne van Vlerken (f)
 September 14 & 15: 2019 Valencia ETU Paratriathlon & U23 European Championships in 
Paratriathlon
 PTWC winners:  Giovanni Achenza (m) /  Christiane Reppe (f)
 PTS2 winners:  Jules Ribstein (m) /  Fran Brown (f)
 PTS3 winners:  Daniel Molina (m) /  Elise Marc (f)
 PTS4 winners:  Alexis Hanquinquant (m) /  Elke van Engelen (f)
 PTS5 winners:  Martin Schulz (m) /  Lauren Steadman (f)
 PTVI winners:  Jose Luis García Serrano (m) /  Susana Rodriguez (f)
 U23
 U23 winners:  Ben Dijkstra (m) /  Lisa Tertsch (f)
 October 5 & 6: 2019 Alhandra ETU Triathlon Mixed Relay Clubs European Championships in 
 Mixed Relay winners:  (Cassandre Beaugrand, Anthony Pujades, Leonie Periault, & Dorian Coninx)
 Junior Mixed Relay winners:  (Inês Rico, Francois Vie, Gabriela Ribeiro, & Afonso Nunes)

Confederación Americana de Triathlon (CAMTRI)
 March 9 & 10: 2019 Sarasota CAMTRI Paratriathlon American Championships in 
 PTWC winners:  Joshua Sweeney (m) /  Kendall Gretsch (f)
 PTS2 winners:  Mark Barr (m) /  Hailey Danz (f)
 PTS4 winners:  Eric McElvenny (m) /  Kelly Elmlinger (f)
 PTS5 winners:  Stefan Daniel (m) /  Grace Norman (f)
 PTVI winners:  Aaron Scheidies (m) /  Elizabeth Baker (f)
 May 3 – 5: 2019 Monterrey CAMTRI Triathlon American Championships in 
 Elite winners:  Irving Pérez (m) /  Elizabeth Bravo (f)
 Junior winners:  Brock Hoel (m) /  Anahi Alvarez Corral (f)
 U23 winners:  Manoel Messias (m) /  Erika Ackerlund (f)
 Mixed Relay winners: 
 June 2: 2019 Santa Marta CAMTRI Aquathlon American Championships in 
 Elite winners:  Ivan Eduardo Castro Garcia (m) /  Maira Alejandra Vargas (f)
 Junior winners:  Jeisson Leonardo Fierro Calderon (m) /  Naomi Espinoza Guablocho (f)
 U23 winners:  Eduardo Londoño Naranjo (m) /  Itzel Arroyo Aquino (f)

Oceania Triathlon Union (OTU)
 February 24: 2019 Newcastle OTU Paratriathlon Oceania Championships in 
 Note: There were no PTS2 and PTS3 events here.
 PTWC winners:  Nic Beveridge (m; default) /  Lauren Parker (f)
 PTS4 winners:  Clint Pickin (m) /  Sally Pilbeam (f)
 PTS5 winners:  Joshua Kassulke (m; default) /  Kate Doughty (f)
 PTVI winners:  Jonathan Goerlach (m) /  Katie Kelly (f)
 March 2 & 3: 2019 Devonport OTU Sprint Triathlon Oceania Cup and Sprint Triathlon Oceania Championships in 
 Elite winners:  Tayler Reid (m) /  Joanne Miller (f)
 Junior winners:  Dylan Mccullough (m) /  Hannah Knighton (f)
 U23 winners:  Tayler Reid (m) /  Joanne Miller (f)
 Mixed Relay winners:  (Nicole van der Kaay, Tayler Reid, Ainsley Thorpe, & Hayden Wilde)
 April 14: 2019 Moreton Bay OTU Triathlon Oceania Cup and Triathlon Oceania Championships in 
 Elite winners:  Brandon Copeland (m) /  Kelly-Ann Perkins (f)
 U23 winners:  Brandon Copeland (m) /  Brittany Dutton (f)

Asian Triathlon Confederation (ASTC)
 March 2 & 3: 2019 Putrajaya ASTC Powerman Middle Distance Duathlon Asian Championships in 
 Elite winners:  Antony Costes (m) /  Annamária Eberhardt-Halász (f)
 June 20 – 23: 2019 Gyeongju ASTC Triathlon Asian Championships in 
 Elite winners:  Oscar Coggins (m) /  Ai Ueda (f)
 Junior winners:  Mitsuho Mochizuki (m) /  Chisato Nakajima (f)
 U23 winners:  Daryn Konysbayev (m) /  WEI Wen (f)
 Mixed Relay winners:  (Yuka Sato, Takumi Hojo, Juri Ide, & Kenji Nener)

African Triathlon Union (ATU)
 June 1 & 2: 2019 Shandrani ATU Triathlon African Championships in 
 Elite winners:  Wian Sullwald (m) /  Gillian Sanders (f)
 Junior winners:  Jamie Riddle (m) /  Amber Schlebusch (f)
 U23 winners:  Ben de la Porte (m) /  Ons Lajili (f)
 Youth winners:  Abdelrahman Sherif (m) /  Laetitia D`Autriche (f)
 June 29 & 30: 2019 Cape Town ATU Duathlon African Championships in 
 Elite winners:  Herculaas Cronje (m) /  Carlyn Fischer (f)
 U23 winners:  Herculaas Cronje (m) /  Cristina Heywood (f; default)

2019 ITU World Paratriathlon Series
 April 27: WPS #1 in  Milan
 PTWC winners:  Jetze Plat (m) /  Eva María Moral Pedrero (f)
 PTS2 winners:  Jules	Ribstein (m) /  Allysa Seely (f)
 PTS3 winners:  Victor Chebotarev (m) /  Anna Plotnikova (f; default)
 PTS4 winners:  Alexis Hanquinquant (m) /  Hannah Moore (f)
 PTS5 winners:  Martin Schulz (m) /  Kate Doughty (f)
 PTVI winners:  Héctor Catalá Laparra (m) /  Alison Peasgood (f)
 May 18 & 19: WPS #2 in  Yokohama
 PTWC winners:  Geert Schipper (m) /  Jade Hall (f)
 PTS2 winners:  Stéphane Bahier (m) /  Allysa Seely (f)
 PTS3 winners:  Nico van der Burgt (m) /  Anna Plotnikova (f; default)
 PTS4 winners:  Alexis Hanquinquant (m) /  Kelly Elmlinger (f)
 PTS5 winners:  Stefan Daniel (m) /  Grace Norman (f)
 PTVI winners:  Jose Luis García Serrano (m) /  Susana Rodriguez (f)
 June 28: WPS #3 (final) in  Montreal
 PTWC winners:  Jetze Plat (m) /  Emily Tapp (f)
 PTS2 winners:  Jules Ribstein (m) /  Allysa Seely (f)
 PTS3 winners:  Daniel Molina (m) /  Anna Plotnikova (f; default)
 PTS4 winners:  Alexis Hanquinquant (m) /  Hannah Moore (f)
 PTS5 winners:  Stefan Daniel (m) /  Claire Cashmore (f)
 PTVI winners:  Dave Ellis (m) /  Susana Rodriguez (f)

2019 ITU Paratriathlon World Cup
 March 2 & 3: PWC #1 in  Devonport, Tasmania
 Note: There were no PTS3 events here.
 PTWC winners:  Nic Beveridge (m) /  Lauren Parker (f)
 PTS2 winners:  Kenshiro Nakayama (m; default) /  Yukako Hata (f; default)
 PTS4 winners:  Oliver Dreier (m) /  Sally Pilbeam (f)
 PTS5 winners:  David Bryant (m) /  Kate Doughty (f)
 PTVI winners:  Arnaud Grandjean (m) /  Katie Kelly (f)
 June 15 & 16: PWC #2 in  Besançon
 Note: There was no women's PTS3 event here.
 PTWC winners:  Alexandre Paviza (m) /  Kendall Gretsch (f)
 PTS2 winners:  Andrew Lewis (m) /  Liisa Lilja (f)
 Men's PTS3 winner:  Nico van der Burgt
 PTS4 winners:  Mikhail Kolmakov (m) /  Elke van Engelen (f)
 PTS5 winners:  Martin Schulz (m) /  Alisa Kolpakchy (f)
 PTVI winners:  Antoine Perel (m) /  Melissa Reid (f)
 July 13 & 14: PWC #3 in  Magog, Quebec
 Note: There were no PTS3 events here.
 PTWC winners:  Giovanni Achenza (m) /  Christiane Reppe (f)
 PTS2 winners:  Maurits Morsink (m) /  Melissa Stockwell (f)
 PTS4 winners:  WANG Jiachao (m) /  Elke van Engelen (f; default)
 PTS5 winners:  Chris Hammer (m) /  Kamylle Frenette (f)
 PTVI winners:  Antoine Perel (m) /  Melissa Reid (f)
 August 17: PWC #4 in  Tokyo
 Note: There was no women's PTS3 event here.
 PTWC winners:  Joseph Townsend (m) /  Wakako Tsuchida (f)
 PTS2 winners:  Mark Barr (m) /  Hailey Danz (f)
 Men's PTS3 winner:  KIM Hwang-tae
 PTS4 winners:  Mikhail Kolmakov (m) /  Kelly Elmlinger (f)
 PTS5 winners:  Stefan Daniel (m) /  Lauren Steadman (f)
 PTVI winners:  Dave Ellis (m) /  Jessica Tuomela (f)
 September 8: PWC #5 in  Banyoles
 Note: There was no women's PTS3 event here.
 PTWC winners:  Alexandre Paviza (m) /  Lauren Parker (f)
 PTS2 winners:  Vasilii Egorov (m) /  Melissa Stockwell (f)
 Men's PTS3 winner:  Daniel Molina
 PTS4 winners:  Alejandro Sánchez Palomero (m) /  Mami Tani (f)
 PTS5 winners:  Jairo Ruiz Lopez (m) /  Kate Doughty (f)
 PTVI winners:  Héctor Catalá Laparra (m) /  Anna Barbaro (f)
 October 5 & 6: PWC #6 in  Alanya
 PTWC winners:  Florian Brungraber (m) /  Margret Ijdema (f)
 PTS2 winners:  Mikhail Astashov (m) /  Yukako Hata (f)
 PTS3 winners:  Victor Chebotarev (m) /  Elise Marc (f)
 PTS4 winners:  Mikhail Kolmakov (m) /  Kelly Elmlinger (f)
 PTS5 winners:  Yannick Bourseaux (m) /  Alisa Kolpakchy (f)
 PTVI winners:  Arnaud Grandjean (m) /  Anna Barbaro (f)
 October 19 & 20: PWC #7 (final) in  Funchal
 Note: There was no women's PTS3 event here.
 PTWC winners:  Florian Brungraber (m) /  Eva María Moral Pedrero (f)
 PTS2 winners:  Andrew Lewis (m) /  Melissa Stockwell (f)
 Men's PTS3 winner:  Daniel Molina
 PTS4 winners:  Mikhail Kolmakov (m) /  Kelly Elmlinger (f)
 PTS5 winners:  Carlos Rafael Viana (m) /  Gwladys Lemoussu (f)
 PTVI winners:  Dave Ellis (m) /  Annouck Curzillat (f)

World Triathlon Corporation

Main Ironman Championships
 April 7: 2019 Standard Bank Ironman African Championship in  Nelson Mandela Bay Metropolitan Municipality
 Winners:  Ben Hoffman (m) /  Lucy Charles (f)
 April 27: 2019 Memorial Hermann Ironman North American Championship in  The Woodlands, Texas
 Winners:  Patrik Nilsson (m) /  Daniela Ryf (f)
 June 9: 2019 Cairns Airport Ironman Asia-Pacific Championship in  Cairns
 Winners:  Braden Currie (m) /  Teresa Adam (f)
 June 30: 2019 Mainova Ironman European Championship in  Frankfurt
 Winners:  Jan Frodeno (m) /  Skye Moench (f)
 October 12: 2019 Ironman World Championship in  Kailua, Hawaii County, Hawaii
 Winners:  Jan Frodeno (m) /  Anne Haug (f)
 December 1: 2019 Ironman South American Championship in  Mar del Plata

Main Ironman 70.3 Championships
 May 12: 2019 Techcombank Ironman 70.3 Asia-Pacific Championship in  Da Nang
 Winners:  Patrick Lange (m) /  Holly Lawrence (f)
 June 23: 2019 KMD Ironman 70.3 European Championship in  Elsinore
 Winners:  Rodolophe von Berg (m) /  Holly Lawrence (f)
 September 7 & 8: 2019 Ironman 70.3 World Championship in  Nice
 Winners:  Gustav Iden (m) /  Daniela Ryf (f)
 November 3: 2019 Ironman 70.3 South American Championship in  Buenos Aires
 Winners:  Rodolophe von Berg (m) /  Chelsea Sodaro (f)
 December 7: 2019 Ironman 70.3 Middle East Championship in  Manama

References

External links

 International Triathlon Union
 IRONMAN Official Site

 
2019 sport-related lists
Triathlon by year